Lojing Viaduct is the third highest bridge in Malaysia. The double box girder bridge is located at  Second East-West Highway (Federal Route ) near Lojing, Kelantan. It opened in 2005. Lojing Viaduct was previously he highest bridge in Malaysia, but in 2018,  Rawang Bypass opened to the public and became the highest bridge in Malaysia, overtaking  Lojing Viaduct. The highest pillar is 58.2 m from ground level.

Bridges completed in 2005
Bridges in Kelantan
Box girder bridges